Hymner til natten is a 1991 Danish play based on the Hymns to the Night by Novalis (published in 1800).

Bibliography 
 Henrik Satou: Hymner til natten, Ålborg : Jomfru Ane Teatret, 1991.

20th-century Danish plays
1991 plays
Novalis